Leimgruber is a surname. Notable people with the surname include:

Darcia Leimgruber (born 1989), Swiss  ice hockey player
Oskar Leimgruber (1886–1976), Swiss Politician
Urs Leimgruber (born 1952), Swiss saxophonist
Werner Leimgruber (born 1934), Swiss footballer
Wilhelm Leimgruber, Austrian luger

See also 
Leimgruber–Batcho indole synthesis, series of organic reactions